Raisa Noevna Blokh (1899–1943) was a Russian poet. She emigrated to Berlin in the 1920s where she was active in the Berlin Poets' Club along with her husband Mikhail Gorlin. Blokh published her poetry in several Russian emigre literary journals including Sovremennye zapiski and Chisla.

The exact circumstances of Blokh's death remain unknown. Both she and Gorlin perished after being arrested by German forces during the Second World War.

Writings
1928. Moi Gorod. Berlin: Petropolis.
1935. Tishina: stikhi 1928–1934  (With Mirra Borodina). Berlin: Petropolis.
1939. Zaviety: stikhotvoreniia. Brussels: Petropolis.

References
Dictionary of Russian Women Writers. 1994. Greenwood Press.

Soviet writers
1899 births
1943 deaths
Soviet emigrants to Germany
Soviet Jews
Russian Jews who died in the Holocaust
Soviet people who died in Nazi concentration camps